Events from the year 2001 in Taiwan, Republic of China. This year is numbered Minguo 90 according to the official Republic of China calendar.

Incumbents
 President – Chen Shui-bian
 Vice President – Annette Lu
 Premier – Chang Chun-hsiung
 Vice Premier – Lai In-jaw

Events

January
 14 January – The start of Amorgos oil spill offshore Pingtung County.

February
 13 February – The opening of 921 Earthquake Museum of Taiwan in Wufeng Township, Taichung County.
 16 February – The start of operation of Hsinchu City EPB Incinerator Plant in North District, Hsinchu City.

March
 24 March – 2001 Kuomintang chairmanship election
 26 March – The establishment of Cross-Straits Common Market Foundation in Taipei.

April
 6 April – The debut of Asia Market Week.
 12 April – The debut of Meteor Garden.
 27 April – Hualien Airport was certified for international flights.
 28 April – The opening of Meinong Hakka Culture Museum in Kaohsiung County.

May
 3 May – The debut of Romance in the Rain.
 5 May – The 12th Golden Melody Awards in Kaohsiung.
 27 May – The opening of Museum of Contemporary Art Taipei in Taipei.

June
 12 June – The founding of Himax.
 14 June – The establishment of Council for Hakka Affairs of the Executive Yuan.

July
 24 July – The founding of Taiwan Solidarity Union.

August
 11 August – The debut of Poor Prince.
 12 August – The opening of Yuanlin Performance Hall in Yuanlin City, Changhua County.

September
 5 September – The formation of Typhoon Nari.
 11 September
 The launching of Azio TV.
 The launching of the first album of S.H.E.

October
 11 October – The promulgation of the Petroleum Administration Act.
 16 October – The reopening of Institute of Yilan County History at its current place.
 26 October – The opening of Breeze Center in Taipei.

December
 1 December
 2001 Republic of China legislative election.
 2001 Republic of China local elections.
 6 December – The debut of Lavender.
 10 December – The debut of The New Adventures of Chor Lau-heung.

Births
 23 September - Lai Kuan-lin - singer and actor
 6 October – Cindy Chi, actress

References

 
Years of the 21st century in Taiwan
Taiwan
2000s in Taiwan
Taiwan